Roelof Paul Citroen (15 December 1896 – 13 March 1983) was a German-born Dutch artist, art educator and co-founder of the New Art Academy in Amsterdam. Among his best-known works are the photo-montage Metropolis and the 1949 Dutch postage stamps.

Biography

Early life
Citroen was born and grew up in a middle-class family in Berlin to Hendrik Roelof Citroen (1865–1932), a Dutch Jew from Amsterdam while his mother, Ellen Philippi (1872–1945), was from a Berlin Jewish family. His father owned a fur shop and passed away in Berlin just before the onset of Nazi Germany while his mother died due to illness at the Bergen-Belsen concentration camp. His sister Ilse Citroen (died with her husband at the Auschwitz concentration camp) was the mother of Sanne Ledermann, a friend of Anne Frank. At an early age, Citroen began drawing, provoking strong support from his parents. He soon started to experiment with photography with Erwin Blumenfeld and studied art in Berlin.

As a painter, he was a Dadaist.  As a visual artist in photography, he used the Bauhaus Style of physical portraits, many times with the subject peering intensely into the camera.

In 1919 Citroen began studying at the Bauhaus, where he started taking lessons from Paul Klee and Wassily Kandinsky (part of Der Blaue Reiter) and Johannes Itten, who became one of his biggest influences. Around this time, he started Metropolis (1923), which became his best-known piece. Citroen's Metropolis influenced Fritz Lang to make his classic film Metropolis. Between 1929 and 1935, Citroen made many photographs, clearly influenced by his work with Blumenfeld.

Citroen's work was included in the 1939 exhibition and sale Onze Kunst van Heden (Our Art of Today) at the Rijksmuseum in Amsterdam.

Later life
He soon started up the Nieuwe Kunstschool (New Art School) with Charles Roelofsz. It ran out of money and closed down in 1937. That year, Citroen became a scholar at the Royal Academy of Art in The Hague. When Citroen was warned that he was due to be arrested on August 28, 1942, he fled to Maria Helena Friedlaender (nee Bruhn), a German woman, wife of Henri Friedlaender. She hid him with other fugitives in the attic of her house in Wassenaar, South Holland, for several months.

Among his many students are Kees Bol, Madeleine Gans, Henk Hartog, and Jos Zeegers. He designed his monumental postage stamps in 1949. In 1960 he stopped teaching and started painting portraits as his main focus. He painted portraits of famous Dutch people, including a well-known portrait of Liesbeth List in 1979.

Paul Citroen died in 1983 in Wassenaar.

Public collections 
 Gemeentemuseum Den Haag
 Hermann-Hesse-Museum, Calw
 Literatuurmuseum, Den Haag
 Museum De Fundatie, Zwolle
 Rijksmuseum Amsterdam
 Prentenkabinet Rijksuniversiteit, Leiden
 Stedelijk Museum Amsterdam
 MoMA, New York
 Metropolitan Museum of Art, New York
 Art Institute of Chicago

References

 Answers - The Most Trusted Place for Answering Life's Questions
 Paul Citroen (1896-1983)
 Discover painter, watercolorist, draftsman Paul Citroen

External links 

1896 births
1983 deaths
Bauhaus alumni
Dutch Jews
Jewish painters
Artists from Berlin
20th-century Dutch painters
Dutch male painters
Royal Academy of Art, The Hague alumni
Jewish emigrants from Nazi Germany to the Netherlands
Anne Frank